Climbing Silver (棒銀 bōgin, literally "pole-silver") is a shogi strategy.

Climbing Silver involves advancing a silver upward along with an advanced or dropped pawn supported by the rook aiming to break through the opponent's camp on their bishop's side.

Many different Static Rook shogi openings include a Climbing Silver component. For instance, Climbing Silver can played as part of Double Wing Attack, Fortress, or Bishop Exchange openings. (However, there are other variants of these openings that don't include Climbing Silver.) Climbing Silver can also be used against Ranging Rook opponents as well.

Diagonal Climbing Silver or Oblique Climbing Silver (斜め棒銀 naname bōgin) is a Climbing Silver attack involving the left silver which moves diagonally from its starting position on 7i to attack on the third or second files. This type of Climbing Silver is typical in Static Rook vs Ranging Rook games.

Positioning

In the adjacent diagrams, the Black's silver advances to rank 5.

Once the silver has reached the e file (S-15 in the adjacent diagram), Black can attempt to attack White's bishop pawn at 23 by advancing their pawn (P-24). White can capture Black's pawn, but the silver can recapture White's pawn. Because White did not properly defend their bishop's head here, White's camp is somewhat weaker and more susceptible to subsequent attacks from Black.

Similarly, it's also possible to play Climbing Silver when Black has no pawn on the second file. Here the silver can climb to the empty 25 square. And, if there's a pawn in hand, then that pawn can be dropped to 24.

In the board diagram to the right, the Black's silver has successfully climbed to rank 5 on the first file (15). 

A subsequent attack by Black, for example, could aim to sacrifice this silver in order to remove White's lance and then drop a dangling pawn within White's camp that threatens to promote.

Climbing Silver formations may be used with several different Static Rook openings such as Fortress, Double Wing, and Bishop Exchange as well as Ranging Rook openings such as Fourth File Rook.

See also

 Climbing Gold
 Bishop Exchange Climbing Silver
 Double Wing Attack
 Bishop Exchange, Rushing Silver
 Reclining Silver
 Shogi opening
 Shogi strategy

References

Bibliography

External links

 How to Defend in Shogi: Basic Formation 1: Bogin
 YouTube: HIDETCHI's Shogi Openings: Rapid Encountered Yagura, Primitive Climbing Silver  · Climbing Silver played by White in Fortress
 YouTube: HIDETCHI's Shogi Openings: Bishop Exchange #1  · Climbing Silver played by Black in Bishop Exchange (from 11 min 58 sec to 19 min 40 sec)
 YouTube: HIDETCHI's Shogi Openings: Bishop Exchange #2  · Merits of Climbing Silver vs other silver strategies in Bishop Exchange
 YouTube: HIDETCHI's Shogi Openings: Bishop Exchange #4 (white's one-turn loss bishop exchange)  · Climbing Silver in One-Turn Loss Bishop Exchange (from 8 min 24 sec to 9 min 54 sec)

Shogi openings
Static Rook openings